Families for Russian and Ukrainian Adoption (also known as FRUA) is a United-States-based non-profit organization, founded in 1994, which "offers families hope, help and community by providing connection, education, resources, and advocacy, and works to improve the lives of orphaned children."

FRUA serves as a support organization for families who have adopted children from 32 Eastern European and Central Asian countries, as well as those adopted children themselves, and their siblings. FRUA organizes its members to advocate for and educate the public about adoption from these countries.

"This is a nonprofit support network for families with children from Russia, Ukraine, and neighboring countries, such as Lithuania, Moldova, Tajikistan, and Turkmenistan. FRUA was started in 1993 in  Washington, D.C., and is a national organization with regional chapters. It has various on-going orphanage support programs, and 
members have access to the quarterly newsletter and hotline on various adoption issues."

Social scientists researching international adoption have interviewed and surveyed individuals found through FRUA's listservs, and used FRUA's annual member survey as a raw data source.

History and organization

Founders

Organization

Chairpersons

Leadership

Countries represented 
Below is an incomplete list of countries from FRUA children have come:

 Albania
 Armenia
 Azerbaijan
 Belarus
 Bosnia and Herzegovina
 Bulgaria
 Croatia
 Czech Republic
 Estonia
 Georgia
 Hungary
 Kazakhstan
 Kosovo
 Kyrgyzstan
 Latvia
 Lithuania
 Macedonia
 Moldova
 Montenegro
 Poland
 Romania
 Russia
 Serbia
 Slovakia
 Slovenia
 Tajikistan
 Turkmenistan
 Ukraine
 Uzbekistan

References 

Adoption-related organizations